Calfrac Well Services Ltd. is an oilfield services company operating in Western Canada, Colorado, North Dakota, Arkansas, Pennsylvania, New Mexico, Texas, Western Siberia and Argentina. Services include hydraulic fracturing, coiled tubing, cementing and other well stimulation techniques designed to help increase the production of oil and natural gas.

History
Calfrac Well Services Ltd. (CWS) was founded in June 1999 as a private corporation by Ronald P. Mathison, Douglas Ramsay, Gordon Dibb, and Robert (Robbie) Roberts. At that time, Calfrac had a single coiled tubing unit and was based in Medicine Hat, Alberta. In December 2000, Calfrac acquired Dynafrac Well Services Ltd. and with it a two-pumper fracturing spread, a shallow coiled tubing unit, a high rate nitrogen pumper and four acid pumpers.  By the spring of 2001, Calfrac had acquired and constructed seven fracturing spreads plus other well stimulation equipment.

Early in 2002, CWS expanded to the U.S. Rocky Mountain region and started offering fracturing services through a field office in Platteville, Colorado. Calfrac continued to construct more fracturing spreads in 2002 and 2003, and had nine complete spreads by the start of 2004. In addition to building fracturing spreads in 2003, CWS also purchased four shallow coiled tubing units from private companies to increase its fleet of coiled tubing units to eight.

In 2005, the company continued to expand and entered Russia to provide coiled tubing services. In 2007, Calfrac entered the Latin America market. Between 2007 and 2013, the company continued to expand through organic growth and strategic acquisitions.

In 2015, Calfrac became the first pressure pumping company to receive the American Petroleum Institute's (API) Specification Q2. Between 2015 and 2016, seven North American locations become certified under API Q2.

See also
List of oilfield service companies

References

External links
Calfrac Well Services Ltd.
Yahoo! - Summary of Calfrac Well Services Ltd.

Companies listed on the Toronto Stock Exchange
Oilfield services companies
Companies based in Calgary
Engineering companies of Canada